Season fifteen of the television program American Experience originally aired on the PBS network in the United States on November 11, 2002 and concluded on July 14, 2003.  The season contained 13 new episodes and began with the first part of the film Jimmy Carter.

Episodes

References

2002 American television seasons
2003 American television seasons
American Experience